Jeffrey Scott Grob (born March 19, 1961) is an American prelate of the Roman Catholic Church who has been serving as an auxiliary bishop for the Archdiocese of Chicago since 2020.

Biography

Early life 
Jeffrey Grob was born on March 19, 1961, in Cross Plains, Wisconsin to Gerald and Bonnie Grob and grew up on a dairy farm. He attended Saint Francis Xavier School in Cross Plains and high school at Holy Name High School Seminary in Madison, Wisconsin. He pursued higher education at Saint Meinrad Seminary in Saint Meinrad, Indiana and the Pontifical College Josephinum in Ohio, graduating in 1988 from the latter with a Bachelor of Religious Studies degree. Grob attended Saint John's University in Minnesota for one year, then continued his studies at Mundelein Seminary in Mundelein, Illinois, receiving a Master of Divinity degree in 1992.

Priesthood 
On May 23, 1992, Grob was ordained to the priesthood for the Archdiocese of Chicago by Cardinal Joseph Bernardin. After his ordination, Grob served as resident and assistant pastor at Sts. Faith, Hope and Charity Parish in Winnetka, Illinois, from 1992 to 1998.  In 1994, he assumed the additional responsibility of assistant chancellor for the archdiocese.  In 1998, Grob moved to Ottawa, Ontario, to attend Saint Paul University, performing weekend pastoral duties at St. Basil Parish in Ottawa.  He obtained a Licentiate in Sacred Theology in 1999 from Mundelein Seminary, and a Licentiate in Canon Law in 2000 from Saint Paul  His doctoral thesis was a comparative study of the 1614 and 1998 versions of the rite of exorcism.

After returned to Chicago, Grob was appointed a judge of the archdiocesan court of appeals. In 2007, he went to study again in Ottawa, receiving a Doctor of Canon Law degree from St. Paul University and a Doctor of Philosophy degree from the University of Ottawa. Back in Chicago in 2008, Grob was appointed pastor of St. Celestine Parish in Elmwood Park, Illinois and dean of Deanery IV-D.In 2015, Grob was appointed judicial vicar for the archdiocese.  In 2017, he was elevated to chancellor.

Auxiliary Bishop of Chicago 
Pope Francis appointed Grob as an auxiliary bishop for the Archdiocese of Chicago and titular bishop of Abora on September 11, 2020.  On November 13, 2020, Grob was consecrated at Holy Name Cathedral in Chicago by Cardinal Blase Cupich.

See also 

 Catholic Church hierarchy
 Catholic Church in the United States
 Historical list of the Catholic bishops of the United States
 List of Catholic bishops of the United States
 Lists of patriarchs, archbishops, and bishops

References

External links

Roman Catholic Archdiocese of Chicago Official Site

Episcopal succession

 

1961 births
Living people
People from Madison, Wisconsin
Saint Meinrad Seminary and School of Theology alumni
Pontifical College Josephinum alumni
College of Saint Benedict and Saint John's University alumni
University of Saint Mary of the Lake alumni
21st-century Roman Catholic bishops in the United States
Bishops appointed by Pope Francis